Gonioma is a genus of flowering plants in the family Apocynaceae first described as a genus in 1838. It is native to South Africa, Madagascar, and Eswatini.

Species
 Gonioma kamassi E.Mey. - Cape Province, Eswatini, KwaZulu-Natal
 Gonioma malagasy Markgr. & Boiteau - Madagascar

References

Apocynaceae genera
Rauvolfioideae